Ptilonia willana is a marine red algal species  endemic to New Zealand.
For a detailed description, see Bonin and Hawkes (1988).

Etymology
The species epithet, willana, honours Eileen Alice Willa who collected the type species at Port Pegasus in 1945.

References

External links
 Museum of New Zealand Te Papa Tongarewa: Ptilonia willana Lindauer (Species)

Flora of New Zealand
Bonnemaisoniaceae